Elena Aleksandrovna Osipova (born 22 May 1993) is a Russian archer. Her first major result was at the 2017 Summer Universiade held in Taipei, Taiwan, where she won the bronze medal in the women's team recurve event. At the 2019 Military World Games in Wuhan, China, she won the silver medal in the women's team event.
 
In 2021, she competed in the individual and team event at the 2020 Summer Olympics, winning two silver medals. That year, she also won the gold medal in both the women's team recurve and mixed team recurve events at the 2021 European Archery Championships held in Antalya, Turkey.

References

External links
 

1993 births
Living people
Russian female archers
Olympic archers of Russia
Archers at the 2020 Summer Olympics
Olympic medalists in archery
Medalists at the 2020 Summer Olympics
Universiade medalists in archery
Universiade bronze medalists for Russia
Medalists at the 2017 Summer Universiade
Place of birth missing (living people)
Olympic silver medalists for the Russian Olympic Committee athletes